Salem Oaks is a subdivision centered at 84th Street and 235th Avenue just south of the village of Paddock Lake in the village of Salem Lakes in south-central Kenosha County, Wisconsin, United States, adjoining Montgomery Lake and Hooker Lake.

Notes

Populated places in Kenosha County, Wisconsin
Neighborhoods in Wisconsin